James Graves may refer to:

James Graves (antiquarian) (1815–1886), Irish antiquarian and archaeologist
James Graves (New South Wales politician) (1882–1964), member of the New South Wales Legislative Council
James Graves (sport shooter) (born 1963), American Olympic sport shooter
James Graves (Victorian politician) (1827–1910), member of the Victorian Legislative Assembly for Delatite
James E. Graves Jr. (born 1953), American judge
James Robinson Graves (1820–1893), American Baptist preacher
Jim Graves (born 1953), American hotel executive and political candidate
 Bau Graves (James Graves), American musician, musicologist and arts activist